Franck Cédric Njiki Tchoutou (born 15 May 1995) is a Cameroonian former footballer who is last known to have played as a winger for Matera.

Career

As a youth player, Cédric joined the youth academy of Italian Serie A side Roma after playing for Aspire Academy in Qatar.

In 2014, he was sent on loan to French second division club Nîmes.

In 2015, he was sent on loan to Voluntari in Romania.

Before the second half of 2016/17, Cédric was sent on loan to Italian third division team Catanzaro.

References

External links
 

Living people
1995 births
Liga I players
Cameroonian footballers
Association football wingers
Serie C players
Ligue 2 players
Cameroonian expatriate sportspeople in Italy
Cameroonian expatriate sportspeople in France
Cameroonian expatriates in Qatar
Expatriate footballers in France
Expatriate footballers in Qatar
Expatriate footballers in Romania
Championnat National 3 players
Nîmes Olympique players
Footballers from Douala
FC Voluntari players
A.C.N. Siena 1904 players
Taranto F.C. 1927 players
U.S. Catanzaro 1929 players
Matera Calcio players
Expatriate footballers in Italy
Cameroonian expatriate sportspeople in Romania
Cameroonian expatriate footballers